Jacobus Adriaan 'André' van Staden  (born 15 December 1946) is a former South African rugby union player.

Playing career
Van Staden played his provincial rugby for Northern Transvaal and was a member of the Currie Cup winning teams in 1969, 1973 and 1974. He was also in the team that drew the final with Transvaal in 1971.

In 1974, Van Staden was selected to tour with the Springboks to France. He did not play in any test matches but played in three tour matches for the Springboks.

See also
List of South Africa national rugby union players – Springbok no.  483

References

1946 births
Living people
South African rugby union players
South Africa international rugby union players
Blue Bulls players
People from Brakpan
Rugby union players from Gauteng
Rugby union centres